Bella is the fifth studio album by singer-songwriter Teddy Thompson, released through the record labels Decca and Verve Forecast in February 2011. Produced by David Kahne, the album features members of Thompson's touring band with Ethan Eubanks on drums, Jeff Hill on bass and Daniel Mintseris on keyboards.

Songs
The album's opening track, "Looking for a Girl", has a twelve-bar blues structure and has been complimented for its "strong beat and catchy melodies".

This is the first of Thompson's albums not to feature an Everly Brothers cover as a hidden track.

Tour
During January and February 2011, Thompson toured throughout the United Kingdom.

Critical reception
Hannah Spencer's review for Contactmusic.com was positive, complimenting Thompson's "great vocal flexibility" and ability to put together a "solid and inoffensive collection of honest-lyriced tunes". On the review site Metacritic, as of February 21, 2011, the album had a score of 71 which indicates Generally Favorable reviews. Allmusic rated the album four out of five stars.

Track listing
 "Looking for a Girl" – 3:23
 "Delilah" – 3:28
 "I Feel" – 3:25
 "Over and Over" – 4:10
 "Take Me Back Again" – 4:14
 "Tell Me What You Want" – 3:26
 "Home" – 4:06
 "The Next One" – 3:48
 "Take Care of Yourself" – 3:17
 "The One I Can't Have" – 2:47
 "Gotta Have Someone" – 3:21

Personnel

 Ethan Eubanks – drums
 Jeff Hill – bass
 David Kahne – keyboards, guitar and string arrangements
 Daniel Mintseris – keyboards
 Richard Thompson – guitar
 Teddy Thompson – vocals, guitar

Release history

References

External links
 net

2011 albums
Albums produced by David Kahne
Decca Records albums
Teddy Thompson albums
Verve Forecast Records albums